Cephetola viridana is a butterfly in the family Lycaenidae. It is found in Cameroon, the Republic of the Congo, the Central African Republic, the Democratic Republic of the Congo, Uganda, Kenya, north-western Tanzania and Zambia. Its habitat consists of primary forests.

References

Butterflies described in 1921
Poritiinae